A swing tag is an informational text attached to a garment for sale and can be also known as a swing ticket. Unlike a laundry symbol or size marker that are sewn into a garment, swing tags are not part of a garment: a swing tag may be attached to the garment by thread or by a plastic joiner.

The term swing tags in the UK is used in a similar way to "hang tags" in America. They are the small pieces of card that denote price, size, barcodes and other information on garments and many retail products.

References

Product management